Miki Mizokuchi (born 13 May 1965) is a Japanese former professional tennis player.

Born in Tokyo, Mizokuchi began competing professionally in 1985 and reached her career best singles ranking of 221 in the world in 1988. Her best WTA Tour performance was a second round appearance at the 1988 Taipei Women's Championships. 

Mizokuchi featured in the women's doubles main draw of the 1990 Australian Open, partnering Kazuko Ito.

ITF finals

Singles: 4 (2–2)

Doubles: 4 (1–3)

References

External links
 
 

1965 births
Living people
Japanese female tennis players
20th-century Japanese women
21st-century Japanese women